Straight Talk America was a political action committee and intercampaign outreach vehicle created by Senator John McCain.  Originally formed during McCain’s 2000 bid for the Republican presidential nomination, it was revived again in 2005, and then retired in 2007 as he announced his formal bid for the presidency in 2008.

Notable people
 Terry Nelson, Senior Advisor
 Lance Tarrance, Adviser – formerly of RT Strategies
 Charlie Condon, Co-chair – former Attorney General of South Carolina
 Bob McAllister, Co-Chair
 Henry McMaster, Attorney General of South Carolina
 Craig Goldman, former executive director; member of the Texas House of Representatives from his native Fort Worth

Funding
According to FEC filings:
 2006 – $$7,938,413
 2008 – $373,703

References

External links
 http://straighttalkamerica.com/ - current website
 https://web.archive.org/*/http://www.straighttalkamerica.com/ - archives courtesy of the Wayback Machine
 http://images.nictusa.com/cgi-bin/fecimg/?C00413245 - FEC Disclosure Reports for STA
 http://www.nndb.com/org/594/000165099/ NNDB - Straight Talk America

United States political action committees
John McCain